Benjamin Lucas was an English soldier of the seventeenth century who served and settled in Ireland.

Lucas served as a colonel during the Cromwellian conquest of Ireland and was present at the Siege of Drogheda. He was granted lands around Corofin in County Clare as part of the Cromwellian Settlement of 1652. He was the great-grandfather of the Irish radical Charles Lucas who served as MP for Dublin City.

References

Bibliography
 Paul Connell, Denis A. Cronin & Brian Ó Dálaigh. Irish Townlands: Studies in Local History. Four Courts, 1998.

17th-century Irish people
People from County Clare
Irish soldiers
English soldiers
English emigrants to Ireland